Route 337 is a state highway in southern Connecticut running for  from US 1 in New Haven to Route 142 in East Haven. The road serves Tweed-New Haven Airport, and is also the main thoroughfare for the East Shore neighborhood of New Haven and the village of Momauguin in East Haven.

Route description
Route 337 begins as Townsend Avenue at an intersection with US 1 in the Annex section of New Haven. It immediately crosses over I-95 without an interchange and heads south towards the Morris Cove neighborhood, passing near Tweed-New Haven Airport and providing access to Lighthouse Point Park. After crossing Morris Creek into the Momauguin section of the town of East Haven, it becomes South End Road then turns east along Silver Sands Road after . Route 337 continues through  the Momauguin area and then turns north along Coe Avenue for another  to end at an intersection with Route 142 south of the town center.

History
The road serving Morris Cove and the Annex neighborhoods of New Haven were town-maintained until the beginning of 1963, where the changes mandated by the 1962 Route Reclassification Act took place. One of the changes implemented was the extension of Route 142, which served the Short Beach section of Branford, along modern Route 337 to the beach communities of Momauguin and Morris Cove. In 1969, Route 142 was truncated to its original western terminus and the former alignment was redesignated as SR 704. In 1987, SR 704 was redesignated as Route 337. In 1997, the eastern end was reconfigured to use Coe Avenue instead of continuing on Silver Sands Road.

Junction list

References

External links

337
Transportation in New Haven County, Connecticut